Fritz Cremer was a German sculptor. Cremer was considered a key figure in the DDR art and cultural politics. His most notable for being the creator of the "Revolt of the Prisoners" (Revolte der Gefangenen) memorial sculptor at the former concentration camp of Buchenwald.

Life
Cremer was the son of the upholsterer and decorator Albert Cremer. One year after his father's death, his mother Christine Cremer moved to Rellinghausen with her children Fritz and Emmy in 1908. In 1911, the mother moved to Essen, where she married a teacher in her second marriage. After his mother died in 1922, Cremer lived with a miner's family.

In 1929, the Austrian expressive dancer Hanna Berger met Cremer and became his partner. In the autumn 1942, Berger was arrested by the Gestapo as a fellow campaigner in Kurt Schumacher's resistance group. In 1944, Berger was able to escape from prison when she was being transferred to Ravensbrück concentration camp during a bombing. She lived illegally in Styria until the end of the war.

In 1953, Cremer married Christa von Carnap (1921-2010), a painter and ceramist who had divorced shortly before. She was the daughter of Alfred von Carnap (1894-1965), a merchant from the Wilmersdorf area of Berlin, and his first wife Susanne Schindler. Christa von Carnap was married in her first marriage to the Schöneberg sculptor Waldemar Grzimek.

Career
Cremer trained as a stone sculptor under Christian Meisen in Essen from 1921 to 1925 after finishing grammar school. During his subsequent work as a journeyman stonemason, he executed some sculptures based on models by Will Lammert and attended sculpture courses at the Folkwang School in Essen during this time. In 1929, as a committed communist, he decided to join the Communist Party of Germany (KPD). He took up studies at the "United State Schools for Fine and Applied Art", (Vereinigte Staatsschulen für Freie und Angewandte Kunst) in Charlottenburg with Wilhelm Gerstel (1879-1963), whose master student he became from 1934 to 1938. During this time Cremer shared a studio with Kurt Schumacher and produced his first socially critical etchings. In 1934 he travelled to Paris. During a trip to London in 1937, Cremer met the writer and playwright Bertolt Brecht, the composer Hans Eisler and the actor Helene Weigel there, who advised him to continue working in Germany. Twice he was a guest of the Villa Massimo in Rome. The first time was in 1937-1938 where he was awarded a fellowship to study for the year, after winning a prize at the "Preußischen Staatspreis für Bildhauerei" (Prussian State Prize for Sculpture). The second time in 1942-43. At the Prussian Academy of Arts, Cremer now ran a master studio himself. He was in close contact with the Red Orchestra resistance group around the sculptor Kurt Schumacher and the writer Walter Küchenmeister. Cremer was linked to a resistance group associated with the actor Wilhelm Schürmann-Horster via Hanna Berger. 

His communist past, possibly not particularly spectacular in terms of political action, seems not to have been taken into account by the Nazi regime; but this is by no means a singular case since talents of all kinds were sought after and employed in the culture industries as long as they kept quiet about their former political options.

From 1940 to 1944, he served in the Wehrmacht as an anti-aircraft soldier in Eleusis and on the island of Crete, after which Cremer became a prisoner of war in Yugoslavia. While he was a soldier would spend any extended leave in Rome where the German Academy had been taken over by the German army. In October 1946, vouched for by his party comrades, he was awarded a professorship and the chair of sculpture department of the Academy for Applied Art in Vienna.

Visual representation in the arts
 Sabine Grzimek: Portrait of Fritz Cremer (Bronze sculptor, 1982).
 Dieter Goltzsche: Portrait Fritz Cremer (lithograph, 47.7 × 34.5 cm, 1969)
 : Portrait Fritz Cremer (oil, 100 × 72 cm, 1963)

Memorial designs
During his time in Austria, Cremer designed two memorials for the victims of fascism, a small one for the French prisoners at Mauthausen near Linz in Austria and a very important and controversial one at the Vienna Central Cemetery, the Memorial for the victims of a free Austria 1934–1945. Controversy was sparked off by the memorial's dedication to the victims of Fascism as from 1934, the year that an authoritarian regime accepted by the Catholic Church took power in Austria.  The memorial represented a naked bronze figure of a resistance fighter, which was considered controversial. Theodor Innitzer, the Archbishop of Vienna wanted a fig leave placed on the sculptor, which Cremer did not accept.

In 1950, Cremer had moved to the German Democratic Republic and took over the master class at the Academy of the Arts, later serving as vice-president from 1974 to 1983. His most important work by far during his earlier life in the GDR is his 1958 bronze sculpture "Revolt of the Prisoners" (Revolte der Gefangenen); set in front of a bell tower, high up in the hills above Weimar, the grouping of 11 figures, some gesturing triumphantly, forms the focal point of a memorial at the site of the former concentration camp of Buchenwald.

A further memorial at Mauthausen was commissioned in 1961 from Cremer by the German Democratic Republic's Association of Victims of Fascism and completed in 1965-1955. This memorial known as "O Deutschland, bleiche Mutter" in bronze dominates a pivotal area of the former concentration camp, the access road to the stone quarries where most of the camp's victims died.

In Fritz Cremer's work, the acts and lovers form the thematic counterpart to the political commissioned works, and also served to calm down and retreat into the private. In them, “her true features and erotic sensuality unite,” “close together, tenderness and fulfilment.”

Stylistically, it cannot be assigned to modernity or to socialist realism. The aim of Cremer's artistic efforts was to make the “mentalic constitution” of the presented. For this reason, Cremer breaks with the idealising representation of the body, while stressing its irregularities.

Overview of creations

Sculpture and busts

 1936: Relief Trauernde Frauen (Gestapo)
 1936–1937: Bust self-portrait as dying warrior, (Büste Selbstbildnis als sterbender Krieger)
 1939: Figurengruppe Mütter
 1947: Freedom Fighter (Freiheitskämpfer)
 1946–1948: Memorial to the Victims of Fascism 1934-1945, Vienna (Mahnmal für die Opfer des Faschismus 1934–1945, Wien)
 1949: Memorial stone for the Ebensee concentration camp (Gedenkstein für das KZ Ebensee)
 1950–1953: Memorial to the Nazi Victims Knittelfeld (Denkmal für die NS-Opfer Knittelfeld) (Österreich)
 1950: 1950: Large Eva nude figure (Aktfigur Große Eva)
 1951: Seated Figure Mother Earth for the Mourning Hall of the Baumschulenweg Crematorium (Sitzende Figur Mutter Erde für die Trauerhalle des Krematoriums Baumschulenweg) (Berlin)
 1951–1952: Sculptural design for the Marx-Engels Monument (plastischer Entwurf zum Marx-Engels-Denkmal), Berlin (nicht ausgeführt)
 1952–1958: Group of figures for the Buchenwald Monument (Figurengruppe für das Buchenwalddenkmal)
 1958: Aufbauhelferin und Aufbauhelfer in einer Grünanlage östlich vom Roten Rathaus
 1959: Schwimmerin. 
 1960–1967: Memorial to the Mauthausen Concentration Camp "O Germany, Pale Mother (Denkmal für das KZ Mauthausen, "O Deutschland, bleiche Mutter")
 1958–1965: Group of figures for the Ravensbrück Concentration Camp Memorial Site (Figurengruppe für die Mahn- und Gedenkstätte Ravensbrück)

 1964: Bronze Bust Hans Eisler (Bronzebüste Hans Eisler)
 1964–1965: Ascending, park of the UN headquarters, New York (Aufsteigender – den um ihre Freiheit kämpfenden Völkern gewidmet; Park des UNO-Hauptquartiers, New York (weitere Güsse dieser Plastik stehen vor der Kunsthalle Rostock und im Skulpturenpark Magdeburg)
 1967–1968: Spanienkämpfer – Denkmal für die deutschen Interbrigadisten in Berlin-Friedrichshain
 1967–1968: Ascending III (Aufsteigender III)
 1968: Karl Marx Monument (Karl-Marx-Denkmal) (Frankfurt)
 1969–1972: Galileo Galilei „Und sie bewegt sich doch!“ (Stadthalle Chemnitz)
 1972: Great Lovers (Großes Liebespaar)
 1972: Entwurf zum Denkmal 50 Jahre Oktoberrevolution
 1978: Auferstehender I
 1979: The Swimmer (Die Schwimmerin)
 1982–1985: Auferstehender II
 1984: Freiheitskämpfer (Skulptur) in Bremen
 1986–1989: Denkmal für Bertolt Brecht, Berlin, Bertolt-Brecht-Platz
 1988: Karl-Marx, Neuhardenberg, Dorfanger
 1991: Karl-Marx

Drawings and lithographs
 1956: Never again, (Nie wieder)
 1956: Mappe Walpursgisnacht (36 Blätter)
 1962: Selbstbildnis
 1963: Kreidekreis
 1966: Fragen eines lesenden Arbeiters (zu Brechts Gedicht)
 1979: "Genug gekreuzigt!"
 1986: Mappe Mutter Coppi und die Anderen, Alle!
 1988: Fritz Cremer Lithographien 1955–88

Book illustrations

Exhibitions
The following exhibitions were held by Cremer: 

 Karl Eulenstein, oil paintings, Fritz Cremer, sculpture: Galerie Karl Buchholz: 42nd exhibition from 18 Nov. to 9 Dec. 1939.
 1951: Berlin, collective exhibition at the Academy of Arts
 1956: Berlin, collective exhibition for the 50th birthday in the National Gallery
 1959: Cairo and Alexandria, collective exhibitions
 1960: Schwerin, Greifswald, Stralsund, Demmin, Eisenach, Magdeburg
 1966: Budapest, Halle and Berlin
 1967: Copenhagen, Erfurt and Rostock
 1968: Berlin
 1970: Oslo, Copenhagen and Bonn
 1973: Budapest
 1976: Warsaw
 1976: Berlin, Altes Museum

 1977: Sofia and Moscow
 1977: documenta 6, Kassel
 1980: Duisburg, Wilhelm Lehmbruck Museum
 1982: Bremen
 1984: Berlin, Pergamon Museum
 1987: Stockholm
 1991: Arnsberg, Sauerland Museum
 1996: Arnsberg
 2000: Oberhausen Castle
 2007: Arnsberg
 2009: Frankfurt am Main and Leipzig, Schwind Gallery
 2010: Dresden, Beyer Gallery
 2011: Frankfurt am Main, Schwind Gallery

Awards and honors

Awards
 1953: National Prize II Class for the bust of the miner and National Prize winner 
 1958: National Prize I. Class for the Buchenwald Memorial
 1961: Art Prize of the FDGB for the portrait bust of Bert Brecht
 1965: Fatherland Order of Merit in Gold
 1972: Goethe Prize of the City of Berlin
 1972: National Prize I. Class for the Complete Works
 1974: Order of Karl Marx
 1976: Hero of Labour
 1978: Order of the Flag of the People's Republic of Hungary
 1981: Bremen Sculpture Prize
 1981: Honorary Gold Medal of the Order of Merit of the Federal Republic of Germany

Honours
In 1967 Cremer became an Honorary Member of the Academy of Arts of the USSR.

Gallery

References

External links

Figures Sculptors of the 20th Century(German/English mix)
Photo exhibition in the argus fotokunst art gallery (on the occasion of 100. anniversary)

1906 births
1993 deaths
People from Arnsberg
People from the Province of Westphalia
Communist Party of Germany politicians
Socialist Unity Party of Germany politicians
Red Orchestra (espionage)
German Army personnel of World War II
Recipients of the Patriotic Order of Merit
Recipients of the National Prize of East Germany
20th-century German sculptors
20th-century German male artists
German male sculptors
West German defectors to East Germany